The Golden Trailer Awards are an American annual award show for film trailers founded in 1999. The awards also honor the best work in all areas of film and video game marketing, including posters, television advertisements and other media, in 108 categories.

It has been called "the Hollywood Awards show for the post-MTV era"  and by its founders as celebrating "the people who condense 120 minutes into a two-minute minor opus."

Overview
The 1st Golden Trailer Awards ceremony was held on September 21, 1999 in New York and had 19 categories. This jury consisted of Quentin Tarantino, Stephen Wooley, Jeff Kleeman and David Kaminow (from Miramax). The cofounders, sisters Evelyn Watters and Monica Brady, promoted their inaugural festival by screening the nominated trailers inside a gold-painted Airstream trailer at the 2000 Sundance festival.

The ceremonies moved to Los Angeles in 2002. Notable jurors in subsequent years have included Pedro Almodovar, Joel Siegel, Ben Stiller, Benicio Del Toro, Glenn Close, and Brett Ratner. Even as the ceremonies have expanded to include 108 categories (show and non-show), they have made a point of remaining short (at 70 minutes) — like the works they are recognizing. All editions have been broadcast online; more recent years have been televised on various networks including HDNet, ReelzChannel and Fox's MyNetworkTV.

Notable additions to the award list include the "Golden Fleece" award, given to the trailer that gives a bad movie the most appeal. Executive Director Evelyn Watters describes it as celebrating the "pure art of cutting"; Executive Producer Monica Brady describes it as recognizing "a great trailer for a movie that is not so great." It has also been called "the most anticipated [award] of the evening."

Hosts for the awards ceremonies have included Kathy Griffin (2002), Dennis Miller (2003), Tom Green (2004), Sinbad (2008), Natasha Leggero (2011), TJ Miller (2015) and Wayne Brady (2016, 2017). The award was designed by artist Jim Bachor.

The 9th Annual Golden Trailer Awards (broadcast as the Movie Preview Awards on MyNetworkTV), in 2008 were at the Orpheum Theatre in Los Angeles. The Dark Knight won three awards: Best Action, Best Summer Blockbuster Poster and Trailer of the Year in the public vote held by USA Today.

The 19th annual awards ceremony was held on May 31, 2018 at the Theater at Ace Hotel in Los Angeles. Michelle Buteau was host and master of ceremonies, and the presenters included Kate Flannery, Lea DeLaria, Yvette Nicole Brown, Nicole Sullivan and Missi Pyle. Paul Dergarabedian of comScore presented the Box Office Weekend Award (The Bow) to Avengers: Infinity War for the highest three day gross between May 1, 2017 and April 30, 2018.

1999
The 1st Golden Trailer Awards were held in 1999, the winners were:
 Best Action: The Matrix
 Best Animation/Family: A Bug's Life
 Best Art Commerce: The Matrix
 Best Comedy: Austin Powers: The Spy Who Shagged Me
 Best Documentary: Return with Honor
 Best Drama: Good Will Hunting
 Best Edit: The Matrix
 Best Foreign: Three Seasons
 Best Horror/Thriller: The Blair Witch Project
 Best Music: Out of Sight
 Best Romance: Great Expectations
 Best Trailer – No Budget: For Return of the Masterminds
 Best Voice Over: The Blair Witch Project
 Best of Show: The Matrix
 Best of the Decade: Se7en
 Most Original: Run Lola Run
 The Dark and Stormy Night: 8MM
 Trashiest: Cruel Intentions
 Golden Fleece: 8MM

2000s
Note: no ceremony was held for the year 2000.

2001
The 2nd Golden Trailer Award ceremony was held in 2001, winners are listed as follows:
 Best Action: Gone in Sixty Seconds tied with Vertical Limit
 Best Animation/Family: Chicken Run
 Best Art and Commerce: Crouching Tiger, Hidden Dragon
 Best Comedy: Best in Show
 Best Documentary: Running on the Sun: The Badwater 135
 Best Drama: Gladiator (for the teaser)
 Best Foreign: Billy Elliot
 Best Horror/Thriller: Unbreakable (for the teaser #1)
 Best Music: Almost Famous
 Best Romance: Crouching Tiger, Hidden Dragon (for the trailer)
 Best Trailer – No Budget: The Big Split
 Best Trailer – No Movie: "AKA"
 Best Voice Over: Valentine
 Best of Show: Requiem for a Dream
 Most Original: Book of Shadows: Blair Witch 2
 The Dark and Stormy Night: Hollow Man
 Trashiest: A Table for One
 Best Title Sequence: Bedazzled
 Golden Fleece: Hollow Man

2002
The 3rd Golden Trailer Award ceremony was held in 2002, the winners were:
 Best Action: A Knight's Tale
 Best Animation/Family: Monsters, Inc.
 Best Comedy: The Royal Tenenbaums
 Best Documentary: Go Tigers!
 Best Drama: Memento
 Best Foreign: Amelie
 Best Independent: Series 7: The Contenders (for the redband trailer)
 Best Music: The Royal Tenenbaums
 Best Romance: Moulin Rouge! (for "Love Story")
 Best Trailer – No Movie: "Wedding Album"
 Best Voice Over: Spider-Man
 Best of Show: The Royal Tenenbaums
 Most Original: Memento
 Trashiest: Series 7: The Contenders (for the redband trailer)
 Best Horror/Thriller: Panic Room
 Best Title Sequence: ?
 Golden Fleece: The Business of Strangers

2003
The 4th Golden Trailer Award ceremony was held in 2003, the winners were:
 Best Action: The Lord of the Rings: The Two Towers (for "Sacrifice")
 Best Animation/Family: Spirited Away
 Best Comedy: About Schmidt (for the teaser)
 Best Documentary: Bowling for Columbine
 Best Drama: The Hours
 Best Foreign: Read My Lips
 Best Horror/Thriller: The Ring
 Best Independent: Read My Lips
 Best Music: About Schmidt (for the teaser)
 Best Romance: Secretary
 Best Trailer – No Movie: "Twelve Twisted Tricks"
 Best Voice Over: About Schmidt (for the teaser)
 Best of Show: About Schmidt (for the teaser)
 Most Original: The Ring
 Trashiest: The Rules of Attraction
 Golden Fleece: Blue Crush

2004
5th Golden Trailer Award ceremony was held in 2004, the winners were:
 Best Action: Charlie's Angels: Full Throttle
 Best Animation/Family: Harry Potter and the Prison of Azkaban (for the teaser #2)
 Best Comedy: Elf
 Best Documentary: Spellbound
 Best Drama: The Lord of the Rings: The Return of the King (for the trailer #1)
 Best Foreign: Osama
 Best Foreign Independent: City of God
 Best Horror/Thriller: Dawn of the Dead
 Best Independent: Lost in Translation
 Best Music: The Triplets of Belleville
 Best Romance: The Cooler
 Best Trailer – No Movie: "Revolver"
 Best Voice Over: 21 Grams (voice over talent: Sean Penn)
 Best Show: The Stepford Wives (for the teaser)
 Most Original: The Stepford Wives (for the teaser)
 Summer 2004 Blockbuster: The Stepford Wives (for the teaser)
 Trashiest: A Miami Tail
 Golden Fleece: Northfork

2005
6th Golden Trailer Award ceremony was held in 2005, the winners were:
 Best Action: War of the Worlds
 Best Animation/Family: The Incredibles (for "Buckle Up")
 Best Comedy: Napoleon Dynamite
 Best Documentary: Fahrenheit 9/11
 Best Drama: Collateral
 Best Foreign: House of Flying Daggers (original title Shi mian mai fu)
 Best Foreign Independent: House of Flying Daggers (original title Shi mian mai fu)
 Best Horror: The Amityville Horror (for "Get Out")
 Best Independent: I Heart Huckabees
 Best Music: Garden State (for the trailer)
 Best Romance: A Very Long Engagement (original title Un long dimanche de fiancailles)
 Best Thriller: Open Water
 Best Trailer – No Movie: Empire Design (for "Fela Kuti")
 Best Video Game Trailer: Medal of Honor: Pacific Assault
 Best Voice Over: The Motorcycle Diaries (original title Diarios de motocicleta)
 Most Original: The Hitchhicker's Guide to the Galaxy
 Summer 2005 Blockbuster: War of the Worlds
 Trashiest: A Dirty Shame
 Golden Fleece: White Noise

2006
7th Golden Trailer Award ceremony was held in 2006, the winners were:
 Best Action: Mission: Impossible III
 Best Animation/Family: Harry Potter and the Goblet of Fire
 Best Comedy: Wedding Crashers(for "The Masters")
 Best Documentary: March of the Penguins (original title La marche de l'empereur)
 Best Drama: Good Night, and Good Luck.
 Best Foreign Action Trailer: District B13 (original title Banlieue 13) tied with Oldboy (original title Oldeuboi)
 Best Foreign Comedy Trailer: FC Venus
 Best Foreign Dramatic Trailer: Paradise Now
 Best Foreign Romance Trailer: The Tiger and the Snow (original title La tigre e la neve)
 Best Horror: The Exorcism of Emily Rose
 Best Independent: Transamerica
 Best Music: Happy Feet
 Best Romance: Pride & Prejudice
 Best Sound Editing in a Trailer: Domino (for the teaser #1)
 Best Thriller: Match Point
 Best Titles in a Trailer: Brick
 Best Trailer – No Movie: 5-25-77 (original title '77)
 Best Video Game Trailer: The Godfather
 Best Voice Over: March of the Penguins (original title La marche de l'empereur)
 Best Show: Mission: Impossible III
 Most Original: Thank You for Smoking
 Most Original Foreign Trailer: Look Both Ways
 Summer 2006 Blockbuster: Mission: Impossible III
 Trashiest: Survival Island (original title Three)
 Golden Fleece: Into the Blue
 Special Audience: Beer League (for the trashiest trailer)

2007
8th Golden Trailer Award ceremony was held in 2007, the winners were:
 Best Action: 300
 Best Documentary: This Film Is Not Yet Rated
 Best Independent: The Science of Sleep (original title La science des reves)
 Best Thriller: The Descent
 Best of Show: 300
 Trashiest: Another Gay Movie
 Golden Fleece: Fur: An Imaginary Portrait of Diane Arbus
 Summer Blockbuster: Harry Potter and the Order of the Phoenix

2008
9th Golden Trailer Award ceremony was held in 2008, the winners were:
 Best Action: The Dark Knight
 Best Action Poster: Resident Evil: Extinction
 Best Action TV Spot: The Bourne Ultimatum (for "I Remember")
 Best Animation/Family: Enchanted
 Best Animation/Family Poster: Shrek the Third (for the teaser poster)
 Best Animation/Family TV Spot: Harry Potter and the Order of the Phoenix (for "Great Wizards")
 Best Anime Trailer: Doctor Strange
 Best Comedy: Tropic Thunder
 Best Comedy Poster: Step Brothers (for the one sheet)
 Best Comedy TV Spot: Harold & Kumar Escape from Guantanamo Bay (for "Campaign")
 Best Documentary: Where in the World Is Osama Bin Laden?
 Best Documentary Poster: Religious (for "Toast")
 Best Drama: No Country for Old Men
 Best Drama Poster: The Assassination of Jesse James by the Coward Robert Ford (for the one sheet)
 Best Drama TV Spot: There Will Be Blood (for "Music Review")
 Best Foreign Action Trailer: Revolver
 Best Foreign Comedy Trailer: My Best Friend (original title Mon meilleur ami)
 Best Foreign Drama Trailer: When Did You Last See Your Father? (original title And When Did You Last See Your Father?")
 Best Foreign Horror/Thriller Trailer: The Eye 3 (original title "Gin gwai")
 Best Foreign Romance Trailer: Paris, je t'aime (for "The Dance")
 Best Horror: I Am Legend
 Best Horror Poster: The Eye (for the one sheet)
 Best Horror TV Spot: Saw IV (for "Clown Blinks")
 Best In-Theater Advertising: Mad Men
 Best Independent Poster: Before the Devil Knows You're Dead
 Best Independent Trailer: Day Night Day Night
 Best International Poster: Trade
 Best Motion/Title Graphics: Hitman
 Best Music: The Diving Bell and the Butterfly (original title Le scaphandre et le papillon)
 Best Romance: Atonement
 Best Romance Poster: 27 Dresses (for the one sheet)
 Best Romance TV Spot: 27 Dresses (for "Invite Event")
 Best Sound Editing: I Am Legend
 Best Summer 2008 Blockbuster Poster: The Dark Knight (for the teaser)
 Best Summer 2008 TV Spot: Wanted (for "Choice Revised")
 Best Teaser Poster: Fantastic 4: Rise of the Silver Surfer (for the teaser)
 Best Thriller: Vantage Point
 Best Thriller Poster: Untraceable (for "Diane")
 Best Thriller TV Spot: No Country for Old Men (for "Friend-o")
 Best Trailer – No Movie: Gamer
 Best Video Game Trailer: The Simpsons Game
 Best Voice Over: The Assassination of Jesse James by the Coward Robert Ford
 Best Wildposts: Forgetting Sarah Marshall (for "Wild Posts")
 Most Original: In Bruges
 Most Original Foreign Trailer: Persepolis (for trailer #2)
 Most Original Poster: Rambo (for "Stencil")
 Most Original TV Spot: Shrek the Third (for "Shrekstra #1")
 Summer 2008 Blockbuster: Iron Man (for "Escaped")
 Trashiest Trailer: Drive Thru
 Golden Fleece: Awake

2009 
10th Golden Trailer Award ceremony was held in 2009, the winners were:
 Best Summer 2009 Blockbuster Poster: Star Trek (for the "Final One Sheet")
 Best Summer 2009 TV Spot: Star Trek (for "Dare")
 Best in Show: Star Trek
 Summer 2009 Blockbuster: Star Trek
 Best Film Festival Trailer: New York, I Love You
 Best Independent Trailer: Happy-Go-Lucky
 Best Music: Star Trek

2010s

2010
11th Golden Trailer Award ceremony award was held in 2010, the winners were:
 Best Independent Trailer: A Serious Man (for trailer #3)
 Best Sound Editing: A Serious Man (for trailer #3)
 Best Summer 2010 Blockbuster Poster: Inception (for "Maze")
 Most Innovative Advertising for a Feature Film: Avatar (for "Planet Pandora")
 Best Action: Avatar (for "Theatrical Trailer")
 Best Action TV Spot: Avatar (for "Kansas")
 Best Animation/Family: How to Train Your Dragon (for "Prepare" trailer #3)
 Best Summer Blockbuster 2010 TV Spot: The Last Airbender (for "Chosen")
 Best in Show: A Serious Man (for trailer #3)
 Most Innovative Advertising for a Brand/Product: The Sound of Music (for "Entertainment Trailer")
 Most Original: A Serious Man (for trailer #3)
 Most Original Poster: Inception (for "Maze")
 Summer 2010 Blockbuster: Inception (for "City")

2011
12th Golden Trailer Award ceremony was held in 2011, the winners were:
 Best Foreign/International Poster: You Will Meet a Tall Dark Stranger
 Best Independent: The Tree of Life
 Best Summer 2011 Blockbuster Trailer: Transformers: Dark of the Moon
 Best Foreign Drama Trailer: Empire of Silver (original title Bai yin di guo)
 Best Foreign Romance Trailer: Empire of Silver (original title Bai yin di guo)
 Best Horror: The Rite
 Best of Show: The Tree of Life
 Most Original: The Tree of Life

2012
13th Golden Trailer Award ceremony was held in 2012, the winners were:
 Best Action: Snow White and the Huntsman (for "Forever")
 Best Action Poster: The Hunger Games (for teaser poster)
 Best Action TV Spot: Sherlock Holmes: A Game of Shadows (for "Beat")
 Best Animation/Family: The Muppets (for "Their Movie")
 Best Animation/Family Poster: The Hunger Games (for "Final Poster")
 Best Animation/Family TV Spot: Puss in Boots (for "Curiosity")
 Best Anime Trailer: The Secret World of Arrietty (original title Kari-gurashi no Arietti) (for "Stand Tall")
 Best Comedy: Bridesmaids (for redband trailer)
 Best Comedy Poster: The Hangover Part II (for "One Sheet")
 Best Comedy TV Spot: 21 Jump Street (for "Arrest")
 Best Documentary: George Harrison: Living in The Material World
 Best Documentary Poster: Something from Nothing: The Art of Rap
 Best Drama: The Girl with the Dragon Tattoo
 Best Drama Poster: The Ides of March (for "One Sheet")
 Best Drama TV Spot: Extremely Loud & Incredibly Close (for "Messages")
 Best Foreign Action Trailer: Elite Squad: The Enemy Within (original title Tropa de Elite 2: O Inimigo Agora e Outro)
 Best Foreign Animation/Family Trailer: The Secret World of Arrietty (original title Kari-gurashi no Arietti) (for "UK trailer")
 Best Foreign Comedy Trailer: The Untouchables (original title Intouchables)
 Best Foreign Documentary Trailer: Anton Corbijn Inside Out
 Best Graphics in a TV Spot: Martha Marcy May Marlene (for "Review")
 Best Horror: The Devil Inside (for "Who")
 Best Horror Poster: Scream 4
 Best Horror TV Spot: The Cabin in the Woods (for "Secret")
 Best Independent: Take Shelter
 Best Independent Poster: Tinker Tailor Toy Soldier Spy (for "One Sheet")
 Best Independent TV Spot: The Artist (for ":60 Spotlight")
 Best International Poster: The Dark Knight Rises (for UK Quad")
 Best Motion/Title Graphics: Anonymous (for domestic trailer #2)
 Best Music: Another Earth
 Best Pre-Show Theatrical Advertising: 21 Jump Street (for "In Theater NCM")
 Best Romance: Like Crazy
 Best Romance Poster: The Lucky One (for "One Sheet")
 Best Romance TV Spot: The Vow (for "Forever")
 Best Sound Editing: The Woman in Black (for "Darkness")
 Best Standee for Feature Film: The Hunger Games
 Best Summer 2012 Blockbuster Poster: The Dark Knight Rises (for teaser one sheet "City")
 Best Summer Blockbuster 2012 TV Spot: Snow White and the Huntsman (for "Ravenna")
 Best Teaser Poster: The Hunger Games (for teaser poster)
 Best Thriller: The Grey (for "Teeth Redband")
 Best Thriller Poster: The Ides of March (for "One Sheet")
 Best Thriller TV Spot: Contagion
 Best Trailer – No Movie: Babylon
 Best Video Game Trailer: The Witcher 2: Assassins of Kings (original title Wiedzmin 2: Zabojcy krolow)
 Best Voice Over: Final Destination 5 (for "Die Again")
 Best Wildposts: Drive (for "Vertical Campaign")
 Best in Show: The Dark Knight Rises (for "Chant")
 Most Innovative Advertising for a Feature Film: Shame (for "Alternative Newspaper Ad")
 Most Innovative Advertising for a Brand/Product: The Hunger Games (for "Faux Motion Ad – Smile Away")
 Most Innovative Advertising for a Feature Film: Shame (for Alternative Newspaper Ad")
 Most Original Poster: The Ides of March (for "One Sheet")
 Most Original TV Spot: The Descendants (for "Paradise")
 Most Original Trailer: Chronicle (for "Camera")
 Summer 2012 Blockbuster Trailer: The Dark Knight Rises (for "Chant")
 The Don LaFontaine Award for Best Voice Over: The Secret World of Arrietty (original title Kari-gurashi no Arietti) (for "UK Trailer")
 Trashiest Poster: Piranha 3DD
 Trashiest Trailer: Piranha 3DD
 Golden Fleece: Apollo 18 (for "Classified")

2013
14th Golden Trailer Award ceremony was held in 2013, the winners were:
 Best Action: Skyfall (for domestic trailer)
 Best Action Poster: The Expendables 2 (for "Last Supper")
 Best Action TV Spot: Fast & Furious 6 (for "Breathe" Super Bowl trailer)
 Best Animation/Family: Wreck-It-Ralph (for "Dreams")
 Best Animation/Family Poster: Life of Pi (for "Mosaic")
 Best Animation/Family TV Spot: Monsters University (for "College AD Imagine")
 Best Comedy: The Hangover Part III (for teaser trailer)
 Best Comedy Poster: Ted
 Best Comedy TV Spot: Ted (for "Name Game")
 Best Documentary: Brooklyn Castle
 Best Documentary Poster: The House I Live In
 Best Drama: Argo
 Best Drama Poster: Argo
 Best Drama TV Spot: Lincoln (for "Vote")
 Best Film Festival Poster: The Last Stand (for "New York Comic-Con" poster)
 Best Film Festival Trailer: Kinetic Imageworkds (for 50th New York Film Festival)
 Best Foreign Action Trailer: The Thieves (original title Dodookdeul)
 Best Foreign Animation/Family Trailer: From Up on Puppy Hill (original title Kokuriko-zaka kara)
 Best Foreign Documentary Trailer: The Gatekeeper
 Best Foreign Drama Trailer: Unfinished Song (original title Song for Marion)
 Best Foreign Graphics Trailer: Painted Skin: The Resurrection (original title Hua pi 2)
 Best Foreign Horror/Thriller Trailer: The Awakening
 Best Foreign Poster: Mabo
 Best Foreign Romance Trailer: Treading Water (original title The Boy Who Smells Like Fish)
 Best Foreign TV Spot: Rust and Bone (original title De rouille et d'os) (for "Sexy Action")
 Best Graphic Design in a TV Spot: The Expendables 2 (for "Tank Review")
 Best Horror: Mama (for "Forever")
 Best Horror Poster: The Last Exorcism Part II (for "Backhend")
 Best Horror TV Spot: Sinister (for "No One")
 Best Independent Poster: Beasts of the Southern Wild
 Best Independent TV Spot: End of Watch (for "Sound Review")
 Best Independent Trailer: Silver Linings Playbook (for "Never Met")
 Best International Poster: Skyfall
 Best Motion/Title Graphics: Argo
 Best Music: Les Misérables (for "I Dreamed a Dream")
 Best Music TV Spot: Django Unchained (for "Unchained BET")
 Best Original Score: Skyfall (for teaser trailer)
 Best Pre-Show Theatrical Advertising: A Good Day to Die Hard (for "Go Big Regal")
 Best Romance: Silver Linings Playbook
 Best Romance Poster: Safe Haven (for one sheet)
 Best Romance TV Spot: Safe Haven (for "Secret")
 Best Sound Editing: Flight (for "Impact Review")
 Best Summer 2013 Blockbuster Poster: Man of Steel
 Best Summer Blockbuster 2013 TV Spot: Fast & Furious 6 (for "Breathe" Super Bowl trailer)
 Best Teaser Poster: A Good Day to Die Hard
 Best Thriller: Trance (for domestic trailer C)
 Best Thriller Poster: Trance
 Best Thriller TV Spot: Dredd (for "Big Addicted")
 Best Video Game Poster: Tomb Raider (for "Tomb Raider")
 Best Video Game TV Spot: Need for Speed: Hot Pursuit 2 (for "Showdown Accolades")
 Best Video Game Trailer: Tomb Raider (for "Tri 3 Survivor")
 Best Voice Over TV Spot: Hansel & Gretel: Witch Hunters (for "Brutal")
 Best Wildposts: The Incredible Burt Wonderstone
 Best in Show: Iron Man 3 (for "Not Afraid")
 Most Innovative Advertising for a Feature Film: The Campaign (for "Cam Dollar")
 Most Original Foreign Trailer: Kill Me Please
 Most Original Poster: Texas Chainsaw 3D (for Special Screening Long Shot")
 Most Original TV Spot: Brave (for Mother's Day: 60")
 Most Original Trailer: Monsters University (for "Admissions")
 Summer 2013 Blockbuster Trailer: Iron Man 3 (for "Not Afraid")
 The Don LaFontaine Award for Best Voice Over: John Dies at the End
 Trashiest Poster: A Haunted House
 Trashiest Trailer: Spring Breakers
 Golden Fleece: Hit and Run (for greenband trailer)

2014
15th Golden Trailer Award ceremony was held in 2014, the winners were:
 Best Action: The Hunger Games: Catching Fire (for the trailer "World Event")
 Best Action Poster: The Hunger Games: Catching Fire
 Best Action TV Spot: Captain America: The Winter Soldier (for "The World 60")
 Best Animation/Family: Frozen (for "The Time Is Forever" trailer)
 Best Animation/Family Poster: Despicable Me 2 (for Side by Side Billboard" poster)
 Best Animation/Family TV Spot: The Lego Movie (for "Special Cast")
 Best Comedy: Bad Words (for redband trailer)
 Best Comedy Poster: Neighbors (for teaser poster)
 Best Comedy TV Spot: Neighbors (for "Mad Neighbors")
 Best Documentary: Blackfish
 Best Documentary Poster: Muscle Shoals
 Best Documentary TV Spot: The Armstrong Lie (for "Ride 60")
 Best Drama: Lee Daniel's The Butler
 Best Drama Poster: Gravity
 Best Drama TV Spot: Rush (for "Mark:60")
 Best Fantasy Adventure: Maleficent (for trailer featuring Lana Del Rey's version of "Once Upon a Dream")
 Best Fantasy/Adventure TV Spot: Star Trek: Into Darkness (for "Go:30")
 Best Foreign Action Trailer: Warrior King 2 (original title Tom yum goong 2) (for "Revenge")
 Best Foreign Animation/Family Trailer: Ernest & Celestine (original title Ernest et Celestine)
 Best Foreign Comedy Trailer: Hector and the Search for Happiness (for the international theatrical trailer)
 Best Foreign Documentary Trailer: Hawking
 Best Foreign Drama: Ida
 Best Foreign Graphics in a Trailer: Journey to the West (original title Xi you: Xiang mo pian) (for "Demons")
 Best Foreign Horror/Thriller Trailer: The Babadook
 Best Foreign Poster: Roxanne
 Best Foreign Romance Trailer: Dirty Weekend (original title Le Weekend)
 Best Foreign TV Spot: The Wind Rises (original title Kaze tachinu) (for "Hayao Miyazaki – Visionary 30")
 Best Graphics in a TV Spot: The Grand Budapest Hotel (for "30TV Dynamite")
 Best Horror: The Conjuring (for "Case")
 Best Horror Poster: You're Next
 Best Horror TV Spot: The Conjuring (for "Event Review")
 Best Independent Poster: 12 Years a Slave (for theatrical release poster)
 Best Independent TV Spot: 12 Years a Slave (for "Fight Back")
 Best Independent Trailer: Dallas Buyers Club (for trailer #1/theatrical trailer)
 Best International Poster: Godzilla
 Best Motion Poster: 2 Guns
 Best Motion/Title Graphics: Transcendence (for "Singularity")
 Best Music: The Secret Life of Walter Mitty (for "Dirty Paws" by Of Monsters and Men in theatrical trail #1)
 Best Music TV Spot: Frozen (for "Let It Go" Review – Disney's Frozen Holiday trailer)
 Best Original Score: The Hunger Games: Catching Fire (for theatrical trailer #4)
 Best Pre-Show Theatrical Advertising for a Band: White House Down (for "NCW")
 Best Romance: The Fault in Our Stars
 Best Romance Poster: About Time
 Best Romance TV Spot: The Great Gatsby (for "You and Me")
 Best Sound Editing: Into the Storm (for teaser trailer)
 Best Standee for a Feature Film: Despicable Me 2 (for "Whack-a-Minion")
 Best Summer 2014 Blockbuster Poster: Godzilla
 Best Summer Blockbuster 2014 TV Spot: Godzilla (for "Flight")
 Best Teaser Poster: The Purge: Anarchy
 Best Thriller: Gravity (for "Detached")
 Best Thriller Poster: You're Next (for Comic Con poster)
 Best Thriller TV Spot: Gravity (for "No Escape")
 Best Video Game Poster: Need for Speed: Rivals
 Best Video Game TV Spot: Diablo III: Reaper of Souls (for "Face Off")
 Best Vine: Sabotage (for "Kill #18")
 Best Viral Video of Campaign: Muppets Most Wanted (for "Watched the Commercials Extended Online")
 Best Voice Over TV Spot: RoboCop (for "60Infomerical")
 Best Wildposts: The Hunger Games: Catching Fire (for teaser outdoor poster)
 Best in Show: Gravity (for "Detached")
 Most Innovative Advertising for a Brand/Product: The Lego Movie (for "Behind the Bricks")
 Most Innovative Advertising for a Feature Film: The Wolf of Wall Street (for "Marty Party")
 Most Innovative Advertising for a Video Game: Yaiba: Ninja Gaiden Z (for "Load of Shit")
 Most Original Foreign Trailer: The Turning
 Most Original Poster: You're Next (for "Graffiti Billboard" poster)
 Most Original TV Spot: Muppets Most Wanted (for "Across the Internet")
 Most Original Trailer: This Is the End (for "April Fools" trailer)
 Trashiest Poster: Lovelace
 Trashiest Trailer: Bad Milo (original title Bad Milo!)
 Best Summer 2014 Blockbuster Trailer: Edge of Tomorrow (for "Converge")
 Best Video Game: Assassin's Creed IV: Black Flag – Freedom Cry (for "Launch" trailer)
 The Don LaFontaine Award for Best Voice Over: Don Jon (for trailer #1)
 Golden Fleece: The Fifth Estate (for "The Future")
 Don LaFontaine Award for Best Voice Over: The Heat (for "Can You Dig It?")

2015
16th Golden Trailer Award ceremony was held in 2015, the winners were:
 Best Action: Furious 7
 Best Action Poster: The Expendables 3
 Best Animation/Family: Big Hero 6
 Best Animation/Family Poster: Minions
 Best Animation/Family TV Spot: Big Hero 6
 Best Billboard: Insurgent
 Best Comedy: Ted 2
 Best Comedy Poster: Ted 2
 Best Comedy TV Spot: Ted 2
 Best Documentary: Life Itself
 Best Documentary Poster: Whitey: United States of America v. James J. Bulger
 Best Documentary TV Spot: Monkey Kingdom
 Best Drama: Selma
 Best Drama Poster: American Sniper
 Best Drama TV Spot: American Sniper
 Best Fantasy/Adventure Poster: The Hunger Games: Mockingjay – Part 1
 Best Fantasy/Adventure: The Hunger Games: Mockingjay – Part 1
 Best Fantasy/Adventure TV Spot: Guardians of the Galaxy
 Best Foreign Action Trailer: Grandmaster
 Best Foreign Animation/Family Trailer: Shaun the Sheep Movie
 Best Foreign Comedy Trailer: The Bachelor (original title The Stag)
 Best Foreign Documentary Trailer: Dark Horse
 Best Foreign Drama Trailer: The Imitation Game
 Best Foreign Graphics in a Trailer: The Babadook
 Best Foreign Horror Trailer: Hollow (original title Doat hon)
 Best Foreign Poster: '71
 Best Foreign Romance Trailer: Far from the Madding Crowd
 Best Foreign TV Spot: Ex Machina
 Best Foreign Thriller Trailer: Ex Manchina
 Best Graphics in a TV Spot: Nightcrawler
 Best Horror: The Woman in Black 2: Angel of Death
 Best Horror Poster: Dracula Untold
 Best Horror TV Spot: The Woman in Black 2: Angel of Death
 Best Independent: Boyhood
 Best Independent Poster: Cut Bank
 Best Independent TV Spot: The Drop
 Best International Poster: As Above, So Below
 Best Motion Poster: Deliver Us from Evil
 Best Music: Guardians of the Galaxy
 Best Music TV Spot: American Sniper
 Best Original Score: Interstellar
 Best Original Score TV Spot: The Hunger Games: Mockingjay – Part 1
 Best Pre-Show Theatrical Advertising for a Brand: Big Hero 6
 Best Romance: Paper Towns
 Best Romance Poster: The Age of Adaline
 Best Romance TV Spot: If I Stay
 Best Sound Editing: Avengers: Age of Ultron
 Best Summer 2015 Blockbuster: Avengers: Age of Ultron
 Best Summer Blockbuster Poster: Minions
 Best Summer Blockbuster TV Spot: Jurassic World
 Best Teaser: Interstellar
 Best Teaser Poster: The Hunger Games: Mockingjay – Part 1
 Best Thriller: American Sniper
 Best Thriller Poster: John Wick
 Best Thriller TV Spot: American Sniper
 Best Trailer/Teaser for a TV Series/Miniseries: Game of Thrones
 Best Viral Campaign: Into the Storm
 Best Voice Over TV Spot: McFarland, USA
 Best Wildposts: The Hunger Games: Mockingjay – Part 1
 Best in Show: Furious 7
 Don LaFontaine Award for Best Voice Over: Inherent Vice
 Golden Fleece: The Giver
 Most Innovating Advertising for a Feature Film: These Final Hours
 Most Original Foreign Trailer: Hyena
 Most Original Poster: Kill the Messenger
 Most Original Trailer: Mad Max: Fury Road
 Trashiest Trailer: Buzzard
 Best Action TV Spot: Alexander and the Terrible, Horrible, Bo Good, Very Bad Day
 Most Original TV Spot: The Hunger Games: Mockingjay – Part 1
 The Don LaFontaine Award for Best Voice Over: Birdman or (The Unexpected Virtue of Ignorance)
 Golden Fleece – Best Action TV Spot: Furious 7
 Golden Fleece – Best Documentary Poster: Whitey: United States of America v. James J. Bulger

2016
17th Golden Trailer Award ceremony was held in 2016, the winners were:
 Best Action: Deadpool
 Best Action Poster: Star Wars: The Force Awakens (original title Star Wars: Episode VII – The Force Awakens)
 Best Animation/Family: The Jungle Book
 Best Animation/Family Poster: The Secret Life of Pets
 Best Animation/Family TV Spot: The Jungle Book
 Best Billboard: Allegiant
 Best Cinematic Vine/Instagram: Victor Frankestein
 Best Comedy: Keanu
 Best Comedy Poster: Dirty Grandpa
 Best Comedy TV Spot: Spy
 Best Documentary: He Named Me Malala
 Best Documentary Poster: Making a Murderer
 Best Documentary TV Spot: Making a Murderer
 Best Drama: The Martian
 Best Drama Poster: The Hateful Eight
 Best Drama TV Spot: Bridge of Spies (for "Standing Man International")
 Best Fantasy/Adventure Poster: The Hunger Games: Mockingjay – Part 2
 Best Fantasy/Adventure: Star Wars: The Force Awakens (original title Star Wars: Episode VII – The Force Awakens)
 Best Fantasy/Adventure TV Spot: The Hunger Games: Mockinjay – Part 2
 Best Foreign Action Trailer: Rise of the Legend (original title Huang feihong zhi yingxiong you meng)
 Best Foreign Animation/Family Trailer: Oddball and the Penguins (original title Oddball)
 Best Foreign Comedy Trailer: Rams (original title Hrutar)
 Best Foreign Documentary Trailer: Amy
 Best Foreign Drama Trailer: Phoenix
 Best Foreign Graphics in a Trailer: The Hallow
 Best Foreign Horror Trailer: Goodnight Mommy (original title Ich seh ich seh)
 Best Foreign Independent: Macbeth
 Best Foreign Music Trailer: Rattle the Cage (original title Zinzana)
 Best Foreign Poster: Downriver
 Best Foreign Romance Trailer: Brooklyn
 Best Foreign TV Spot: Crouching Tiger, Hidden Dragon: Sword of Destiny
 Best Foreign Teaser: High-Rise
 Best Foreign Thriller Trailer: The Wave (original title Die Welle)
 Best Graphics in a TV Spot: The Man from U.N.C.L.E.
 Best Horror: The Witch (original title The VVitch: A New-England Folktale)
 Best Horror Poster: Pride and Prejudice and Zombies
 Best Horror TV Spot: The Conjuring 2
 Best Independent: Spotlight
 Best Independent Poster: The End of the Tour
 Best Independent TV Spot: The Hateful Eight
 Best Independent Trailer (For a Film Budget Shot Under $1-Million U.S.): Grandma
 Best International Poster: Unfriended
 Best Motion Poster: Sinister 2
 Best Motion/Title Graphics: The Man from U.N.C.L.E.
 Best Music: Deadpool
 Best Music TV Spot: Straight Outta Compton
 Best Original Score: The Jungle Book
 Best Original Score TV Spot: The Jungle Book
 Best Radio/Audio Spot: Ride Along 2
 Best Romance: Me Before You
 Best Romance Poster: Me Before You
 Best Romance TV Spot: The Danish Girl
 Best Sound Editing: The Revenant
 Best Sound Editing in a TV Spot: The Witch (original title The VVitch: A New-England Folktale)
 Best Summer Blockbuster Poster: Suicide Squad
 Best Teaser: Joy
 Best Teaser Poster: Straight Outta Compton
 Best Teaser TV Spot: Jessica Jones
 Best Thriller: Black Mass
 Best Thriller Poster: The Martian
 Best Thriller TV Spot: Sicario
 Best Trailer/Teaser for a TV Series/Miniseries: Narcos
 Best Video Game Trailer: Assassin's Creed: Syndicate
 Best Viral Campaign: Paranormal Activity: The Ghost Dimension
 Best Voice Over TV Spot: Zoolander 2
 Best Wildposts: Minions
 Best of Show: Spotlight
 Foreign Trashiest Trailer: Loev
 Golden Fleece: Pixels
 Golden Fleece Foreign: J. Kessels
 Golden Fleece TV Spot: Fifty Shades of Black
 Most Innovating Advertising for a Feature Film: Mission: Impossible – Rogue Nation
 Most Original: Hail, Caesar! (for trailer #2)
 Most Original Foreign Trailer: Mission: Impossible – Rogue Nation
 Most Original Poster: Batman v Superman: Dawn of Justice
 Most Original TV Spot: Zootopia (for "Oscar Review" a.k.a. "Year in Film")
 Summer 2016 Blockbuster: Captain America: Civil War
 Summer 2016 Blockbuster TV Spot: Captain America: Civil War
 The Don LaFontaine Award for Best Voice Over: Anomalisa
 Trashiest Trailer: Blue Mountain State: The Rise of Thadland
 Best Trailer – No Movie: The Legend of Andor
 Trashiest Poster: Dirty Grandpa
 Best Graphics in a TV Spot: Dope

2017
18th Golden Trailer Award ceremony was held in 2017, the winners were:
 Best Action: Baby Driver
 Best Action TV Spot Trailer/Teaser: Narcos
 Best Action Poster: The Magnificent Seven
 Best Action TV Spot: John Wick: Chapter 2
 Best Animation/Family: The Lego Batman Movie
 Best Animation/Family TV Spot Trailer/Teaser: The Simpsons
 Best Animation/Family Poster: Pete's Dragon
 Best Animation/Family TV Spot: The Lego Batman Movie
 Best Billboard: Fantastic Beasts and Where to Find Them
 Best Comedy: The House
 Best Comedy TV Spot Trailer/Teaser: Last Week Tonight with John Oliver
 Best Comedy Poster: The Nice Guys
 Best Comedy TV Series Poster: The Simpsons
 Best Comedy TV Spot: Baywatch
 Best Documentary: Get Me Roger Stone
 Best Documentary TV Spot Trailer/Teaser: Get Me Roger Stone
 Best Documentary Poster: Lo and Behold, Reveries of the Connected World
 Best Documentary TV Spot: 13th
 Best Documentary/Reality TV Series Poster: American Crime Story
 Best Drama: Dunkirk
 Best Drama TV Spot Trailer/Teaser: Big Little Lies
 Best Drama Poster: Hacksaw Ridge
 Best Drama TV Spot: Arrival
 best Drama/Action TV Series Poster: Big Little Lies
 Best Fantasy/Adventure Poster: Star Wars: The Last Jedi (original title Star Wars: Episode VIII – The Last Jedi)
 Best Fantasy Adventure: Wonder Woman
 Best Fantasy/Adventure TV Spot Trailer/Teaser Series: Stranger Things
 Best Fantasy/Adventure TV Spot: Doctor Strange
 Best Foreign TV Spot Trailer/Teaser Series: The Silence Valley (original title Valea Muta)
 Best Foreign Action Trailer: Collide
 Best Foreign Animation/Family Trailer: Loving Vincent
 Best Foreign Comedy Trailer: David Brent: Life on the Road
 Best Foreign Documentary Trailer: I Am Bolt
 Best Foreign Drama: Lion
 Best Foreign Graphics in a Trailer: Loving Vincent
 Best Foreign Horror Trailer: Evolution (original title Evolution)
 Best Foreign Independent: Jawbone
 Best Foreign Music Trailer: Raw (original title Grave)
 Best Foreign Poster: The Man Who Was Thursday
 Best Foreign Romance Trailer: My Cousin Rachel
 Best Foreign TV Spot: Train to Busan (original title Busanhaeng)
 Best Foreign Teaser: Lady Macbeth
 Best Foreign Thriller Trailer: The Girl with All the Gifts
 Best Graphics TV Spot Trailer/Teaser Series: American Horror Story
 Best Graphics in a TV Spot: Moonlight
 Best Horror: It
 Best Horror Poster: Alien: Covenant
 Best Horror TV Poster: Don't Breathe
 Best Horror/Thriller TV Spot Trailer/Teaser Series: Westworld
 Best Horror/Thriller TV Series Poster: Fight of the Living Dead
 Best Independent: Manchester by the Sea
 Best Independent TV Spot Trailer/Teaser Series: I Don't Feel at Home in This World Anymore.
 Best Independent Poster: Moonlight
 Best Independent TV Spot: Moonlight
 Best Independent Trailer (For a Film Budget Shot Under $1-Million U.S.): Deep Water: The Real Story
 Best International Poster: Get Out
 Best Motion Poster: The Birth of a Nation
 Best Motion/Title Graphics: Atomic Blonde
 Best Music: Logan
 Best Music TV Spot Trailer/Teaser Series: Westworld
 Best Music TV Spot: La La Land
 Best Opening Title Sequence of Closing Credits for a Feature Film: xXx: Return of Xander Cage
 Best Opening Title Sequence or Closing Credits for a TV/Streaming Series: Big Little Lies
 Best Original Score: La La Land
 Best Original Score TV Spot Trailer/Teaser Series: Better Call Saul
 Best Original Score TV Spot: Rogue One: A Star Wars Story (original title Rogue One)
 Best Promo for a TV Network: Empowering Women Everywhere
 Best Radio/Audio Spot: The Lego Batman Movie
 Best Romance: The Light Between Oceans
 Best Romance Poster: La La Land
 Best Romance TV Spot: La La Land
 Best Sound Editing: Atomic Blonde
 Best Sound Editing TV Spot Trailer/Teaser Series: Legion
 Bet Sound Editing in a TV Spot: Sully
 Best Summer 2017 Blockbuster: Atomic Blonde
 Best Summer 2017 Blockbuster Poster: Wonder Woman
 Best Summer Blockbuster 2017: Guardians of the Galaxy Vol. 2
 Best Teaser: Blade Runner 2049
 Best Teaser Poster: Kong: Skull Island
 Best Teaser TV Spot: Sausage Party
 Best Thriller: A Cure for Wellness
 Best Thriller Poster: Split
 Best Thriller TV Spot: A Cure for Wellness
 Best Trailerbyte for a Feature Film: The Lego Batman Movie
 Best Trailerbyte for a TV Series/Streaming Series: Fargo
 Best Video Game Poster: Halo Wars 2
 Best Video Game TV Spot: Uncharted 4: A Thief's End
 Best Video Game Trailer: Call of Duty: Infinite Warfare
 Best Viral Campaign: Rings
 Best Viral or Campaign: Rings
 Best Voice Over TV Spot Trailer/Teaser Series: Designated Survivor
 Best Voice Over TV Spot: The Lego Batman Movie
 Best Wildposts: Doctor Strange
 Best of Show: Wonder Woman
 Foreign Trashiest Trailer: The Lure
 Golden Fleece: Resident Evil: The Final Chapter
 Golden Fleece Foreign: A Few Less Men
 Golden Fleece TV Spot: Assassin's Creed
 Most Innovating Advertising for a Feature Film: Arrival
 Most Original: The Nice Guys
 Most Original TV Spot Trailer/Teaser Series: American Horror Story
 Most Original Foreign Trailer: Evolution (original title Evolution)
 Most Original Poster: The Simpsons
 Most Original TV Spot: Sully
 Most Original Trailer: The Nice Guys
 The Don LaFontaine Award for Bet Voice Over: Amazon Studios, Magnolia Pictures, Mark Woollen & Associates
 Trashiest Trailer: Bad Santa 2
 Best Foreign TV Spot Trailer/Teaser Series: ?
 Best Foreign Drama Trailer: ?
 Best Summer 2017 Blockbuster TV Spot: ?
 Best Summer Blockbuster Poster: ?
 Don LaFontaine Award for Best Voice Over: ?
 Most Original TV Spot Trailer/Teaser Series: ?

2018
19th Golden Trailer Award ceremony was held in 2018, the winners were:
 Best Action: Black Panther
 Best Action TV Spot Trailer/Teaser Series: Narcos
 Best Action Poster: Wonder Woman: Crafting the Wonder
 Best Action TV Spot: Black Panther
 Best Animation/Family: Isle of Dogs
 Best Animation/Family TV Spot Trailer/Teaser Series: Bojack Horseman
 Best Animation/Family Poster: Peter Rabbit
 Best Billboard: Jumanji: Welcome to the Jungle
 Best Comedy: Lady Bird
 Best Comedy TV Spot Trailer/Teaser Series: Glow
 Best Comedy Poster: Baskets
 Best Comedy TV Spot: Ocean's Eight
 Best Documentary: Won't You Be My Neighbor?
 Best Documentary/Reality TV Spot Trailer/Teaser Series: One Strange Rock
 Best Documentary/Reality Poster TV Series: Adam Ruins Everything
 Best Documentary Poster: Studio 54
 Best Documentary TV Spot: I Am Not Your Negro
 Best Drama: The Shape of Water
 Best Drama TV Spot Trailer/Teaser Series: Westworld
 Best Drama Poster: Realive
 Best Drama TV Spot: Three Billboards Outside Ebbing, Missouri
 Best Drama/Action TV Series Poster: Ozark
 Best Fantasy/Adventure Poster: The Shape of Water
 Best Fantasy Adventure: Avengers: Endgame
 Best Fantasy/Adventure TV Spot Trailer/Teaser Series: Stranger Things
 Best Fantasy/Adventure TV Spot: Ready Player One
 Best Foreign TV Spot Trailer/Teaser Series: Dark
 Best Foreign Animation/ Family Trailer: Bilal
 Best Foreign Comedy Trailer: The Square
 Best Foreign Documentary Trailer: Devil's Freedom (original title La Libertad del Diablo)
 Best Foreign Drama Trailer: A Fantastic Woman (original title Una mujer fantastica)
 Best Foreign Horror Trailer: The Secret of Marrowbone (original title Marrowbone)
 Best Foreign Independent: BPM (Beats Per Minute) (original title 120 battements par minute)
 Best Foreign Music Trailer: Youth (original title Fang hua)
 Best Foreign Poster: The Silent Revolution (original title Das schweigende Klassenzimmer)
 Best Foreign TV Spot: The Square
 Best Foreign Teaser: Yardie
 Best Foreign Thriller Trailer: Double Lover (original title L'amant double)
 Best Graphics TV Spot Trailer/Teaser Series: Lady Dynamite
 Best Graphics in a TV Spot: The Spy Who Dumped Me
 Best Horror: A Quiet Place
 Best Horror Poster: Winchester
 Best Horror TV Spot: A Quiet Place
 Best Horror/Thriller TV Spot Trailer/Teaser Series: Rellik
 Best Horror/Thriller TV Series Poster: American Horror Story
 Best Independent: I, Tonya
 Best Independent Poster: Okja
 Best Independent TV Spot: Lady Bird
 Best Independent Trailer (For a Film Budget Shot Under $1-Million U.S.): The Endless
 Best International Poster: Wonder Woman: Crafting the Wonder
 Best Motion Poster: Isle of Dogs
 Best Motion/Title Graphics: Baby Driver
 Best Music: Baby Driver
 Best Music TV Spot Trailer/Teaser Series: Stranger Things
 Best Music TV Spot: Black Panther
 Best Original Score: Good Time
 Best Original Score TV Spot Trailer/Teaser Series: Westworld
 Best Original Score TV Spot: Phantom Thread
 Best Radio/Audio Spot: The Hitman's Bodyguard
 Best Romance: Call Me by Your Name
 Best Romance TV Spot: Phantom Thread
 Best Sound Editing: Mother!
 Best Sound Editing TV Spot Trailer/Teaser Series: Stranger Things
 Best Sound Editing in a TV Spot: Atomic Blonde
 Best Summer 2018 Blockbuster: Incredibles 2
 Best Summer Blockbuster TV Spot: Solo: A Star Wars Story
 Best Teaser: Deadpool 2
 Best Teaser Poster: Ocean's Eight
 Best Thriller: Unsane
 Best Thriller Poster: Flatliners
 Best Thriller TV Spot: Dunkirk
 Best Trailer for Book or Novel: The Butchering Art
 Best Trailerbyte for a Feature Film: Super Troopers 2
 Best Trailerbyte for a TV Series/Streaming Series: Westworld
 Best Video Game: Call of Duty: WWII
 Best Viral Campaign: The Disaster Artist
 Best Voice Over TV Spot Trailer/Teaser Series: Comrade Detective
 Best Voice Over TV Spot: Atomic Blonde
 Best Wildposts Teaser Campaign: Love, Simon
 Don LaFontaine Award for Best Voice Over: Mudbound
 Golden Fleece: The Meg
 Golden Fleece TV Spot: Resident Evil: The Final Chapter
 Most Innovating Advertising for TV Series/Streaming: The Long Road Home
 Most Innovating Advertising for a Feature Film: A Quiet Place
 Most Original TV Spot Trailer/Teaser Series: American Vandal
 Most Original Foreign Trailer: Jeannette: The Childhood of Joan or Arc (original title Jeannette, I'enfance de Jeanne d'Arc) tied with The Square
 Most Original Poster: The Vietnam War
 Most Original TV Spot: I, Tonya
 Most Original Trailer: Deadpool 2
 Trashiest Trailer: The Little Hours
 Best Animation/Family TV Spot: ?
 Best Foreign Action Trailer: Beyond the Edge (original title ISRA 88)
 Best Foreign Romance Trailer: ?
 Best Opening Title Sequence or Closing Credits for a Feature Film: ?

2019
20th Golden Trailer Award ceremony was held in 2019, the winners were:
 Best of Show: John Wick: Chapter 3 – Parabellum
 Box Office Weekend: Avengers: Endgame
 Best Action: John Wick: Chapter 3 – Parabellum
 Best Animation/Family: Toy Story 4
 Best Comedy: Long Shot
 Best Documentary: Free Solo
 Best Drama: A Star Is Born
 Best Horror: Us
 Best Independent Trailer: The Favourite
 Best Music: Us
 Best Thriller: Bird Box
 Best Video Game Trailer: Anthem
 Golden Fleece: Serenity
 Most Original Trailer: Roma
 Best Summer 2019 Blockbuster Trailer: John Wick: Chapter 3 – Parabellum
 Best Fantasy Adventure: Avengers: Endgame
 Best Teaser: Once Upon a Time in Hollywood
 Best Romance: A Star Is Born
 Don LaFontaine Award for Best Voice Over: If Beale Street Could Talk
 Trashiest Trailer: Piercing
 Best Motion/Title Graphics: The Irishman
 Best Sound Editing: Bohemian Rhapsody
 Best Original Score: Midsommar
 Best Independent Trailer (for film budget shot under $1.5Million US): Jonathan
 Best Faith-Based Trailer: Holy Lands
 Best Home Entertainment Action: Mission: Impossible – Fallout
 Best Home Entertainment Comedy: Crazy Rich Asians
 Best Home Entertainment Drama: Bohemian Rhapsody
 Best Home Entertainment Family/Animation: Mary Poppins Returns
 Best Home Entertainment Fantasy Adventure: Avengers: Infinity War
 Best Home Entertainment Horror/Thriller: In Darkness
 Best Foreign Action Trailer: Girls of the Sun (original title Les filles du soleil)
 Best Foreign Comedy Trailer: Sink or Swim (original title Le Grand Bain)
 Best Foreign Documentary Trailer: Sharkwater Extinction
 Best Foreign Drama Trailer: Border (original title Gräns)
 Best Foreign Horror Trailer: The Hole in the Ground
 Most Original Foreign Trailer: Temporary Difficulties (original title Vremennye trudnosti)
 Best Foreign Independent Trailer: Aniara
 Best Foreign Music Trailer: Beats
 Best Foreign Thriller Trailer: The Guilty (original title Den skyldige)
 Best Foreign Teaser: Shadow (original title 影)
 Best Action TV Spot (for a Feature Film): Jurassic World: Fallen Kingdom
 Best Animation/Family TV Spot (for a Feature Film): Mary Poppins Returns
 Best Comedy TV Spot (for a Feature Film): Deadpool 2
 Best Drama TV Spot (for a Feature Film): A Star Is Born
 Best Foreign TV Spot (for a Feature Film): Equally Powerful Movies
 Best Graphics in a TV Spot (for a Feature Film): Searching
 Best Horror TV Spot (for a Feature Film): Us
 Best Music TV Spot (for a Feature Film): A Star Is Born
 Best Romance TV Spot (for a Feature Film): Life Itself
 Best Thriller TV Spot (for a Feature Film): Us
 Best Video Game TV Spot (for a Feature Film): Fallout 76
 Best Voice Over TV Spot (for a Feature Film): The Favourite
 Most Original TV Spot (for a Feature Film): Deadpool 2
 Best Documentary TV Spot (for a Feature Film): Free Solo
 Best Fantasy Adventure TV Spot (for a Feature Film): Avengers: Endgame
 Best Original Score TV Spot (for a Feature Film): Native Son
 Best Sound Editing in a TV Spot (for a Feature Film): Hereditary
 Golden Fleece TV Spot (for a Feature Film): Hellboy
 Best Action TV Spot/Trailer/Teaser for a Series: The Boys
 Best Animation/Family TV Spot/Trailer/Teaser for a Series: Anne with an E
 Best Comedy TV Spot/Trailer/Teaser for a Series: Atlanta
 Best Drama TV Spot/Trailer/Teaser for a Series: Escape at Dannemora
 Best Documentary/Reality TV Spot/Trailer/Teaser for a Series: The Staircase
 Best Fantasy Adventure TV Spot/Trailer/Teaser for a Series: Game of Thrones
 Best Foreign TV Spot/Trailer/Teaser for a Series: Arde Madrid
 Best Graphics in a TV Spot/Trailer/Teaser for a Series: Biography
 Best Horror/Thriller TV Spot/Trailer/Teaser for a Series: Chernobyl
 Best Music TV Spot/Trailer/Teaser for a Series: Stranger Things
 Best Original Score TV Spot/Trailer/Teaser for a Series: The Twilight Zone
 Best Sound Editing TV Spot/Trailer/Teaser for a Series: Stranger Things
 Best Voice Over in a TV Spot/Trailer/Teaser for a Series: The Handmaid's Tale
 Most Original TV Spot/Trailer/Teaser for a Series: Maniac
 Best Promo for a TV Network: HBO
 Best Title/Credit Sequence for a Feature Length Film (or Video Game): Escape Room
 Best Title/Credit Sequence for a TV/Streaming Series: Chilling Adventures of Sabrina
 Best Promo for a OTO or Special:  HBO
 Best Action Poster: John Wick: Chapter 3 – Parabellum
 Best Animation/Family Movie Poster: A Dog's Way Home
 Best Billboard: Roma
 Best Comedy Poster: The Hustle
 Best Documentary Poster: Free Solo
 Best Drama Poster: Roma
 Best Fantasy Adventure Poster: Captain Marvel
 Best Foreign Poster: Firecrackers
 Best Horror Poster: The Nun
 Best Independent Poster: Private Life
 Best International Poster: Bohemian Rhapsody
 Best Motion Poster: Mary Poppins Returns
 Best Summer 2019 Blockbuster Poster: The Lion King
 Best Teaser Poster: John Wick: Chapter 3 – Parabellum
 Best Thriller Poster: Glass
 Best Video Game Poster: Prey: Mooncrash
 Best Wildposts: Roma
 Most Original Poster: I Think We're Alone Now
 Best Animation/Family Poster for a TV/Streaming Series: Castlevania
 Best Comedy Poster for a TV/Streaming Series: Young Sheldon
 Best Documentary/Reality Poster for a TV/Streaming Series: The Inventor: Out for Blood in Silicon Valley
 Best Drama/Action Poster for a TV/Streaming Series: Black Mirror: Bandersnatch
 Best Horror/Thriller Poster for a TV/Streaming Series: Ghoul
 Best WildPosts for a TV/Streaming Series: Ozark
 Most Innovative Advertising for a Feature Film: Us
 Most Innovative Advertising for a TV/Streaming Series: Shark Week
 Best Viral Campaign: Hulu
 Best TrailerByte for a Feature Length Film: Mid90s
 Best TrailerByte for a TV/Streaming Series: Parker Strong: How the New England Patriots Became Super Heroes
 Best Radio/Audio Spot (All Genres): A Star Is Born

2020s

2021
The 21st Annual Awards ceremony was live-streamed from the Niswonger Performing Arts Center (NPAC) in Greeneville, Tennessee.
 Best of Show: A Quiet Place: Part II
 Box Office Weekend: Avengers: Endgame
 Best Action: 1917
 Best Animation/Family: Soul 
 Best Comedy: Palm Springs
 Best Documentary: The Painter and the Thief
 Best Drama: Queen & Slim
 Best Horror: A Quiet Place: Part II
 Best Independent Trailer: Uncut Gems
 Best Music: Ma Rainey's Black Bottom
 Best Thriller: Joker
 Best Video Game Trailer: Assassin's Creed Valhalla
 Golden Fleece: Capone 
 Most Original Trailer: Cherry 
 Best Summer 2021 Blockbuster Trailer: F9
 Best Fantasy Adventure: Black Widow
 Best Teaser: Jojo Rabbit
 Best Romance: The Map of Tiny Perfect Things
 Best Trailer No Movie:  The Lost Blonde: The Veronica Lake Story
 Don LaFontaine Award for Best Voice Over: Marriage Story
 Trashiest Trailer: White Trash Ninja: Ninja Badass
 Best Motion/Title Graphics: Judy & Punch 
 Best Sound Editing: 1917
 Best Original Score: Star Wars: The Rise of Skywalker 
 Best Independent Trailer (for film budget shot under $1.5Million US): Never Rarely Sometimes Always
 Best Faith-Based Trailer: I Still Believe
 Best Home Entertainment Action: Captain Marvel
 Best Home Entertainment Comedy:  Freaky
 Best Home Entertainment Drama: The Cotton Club Encore
 Best Home Entertainment Family/Animation: Call of the Wild 
 Best Home Entertainment Fantasy Adventure: Star Wars: The Rise of Skywalker
 Best Home Entertainment Horror/Thriller: Fear of Rain
 Best Foreign Action Trailer: Major Grom: Plague Doctor
 Best Foreign Comedy Trailer:  Blinded by the Light
 Best Foreign Documentary Trailer: The Painter and the Thief
 Best Foreign Drama Trailer: The Life Ahead 
 Best Foreign Horror Trailer: Saint Maud
 Most Original Foreign Trailer: Deerskin
 Best Foreign Independent Trailer: Parasite
 Best Foreign Music Trailer: Blinded by the Light
 Best Foreign Thriller Trailer: Official Secrets 
 Best Foreign Teaser: Redemption Of A Rogue 
 Best Action TV Spot (for a Feature Film): Top Gun: Maverick
 Best Animation/Family TV Spot (for a Feature Film): Frozen II
 Best Comedy TV Spot (for a Feature Film): 6 Underground
 Best Drama TV Spot (for a Feature Film): Cherry 
 Best Foreign TV Spot (for a Feature Film): The Right Kind of Movies
 Best Graphics in a TV Spot (for a Feature Film): Jojo Rabbit
 Best Horror TV Spot (for a Feature Film):  It Chapter Two
 Best Independent TV Spot (for a Feature Film):  The Outpost
 Best Music TV Spot (for a Feature Film): Uncut Gems
 Best Romance TV Spot (for a Feature Film): Emma
 Best Summer Blockbuster TV Spot (for a Feature Film):  Black Widow
 Best Thriller TV Spot (for a Feature Film): A Quiet Place: Part II
 Best Video Game TV Spot (for a Feature Film): Call of Duty: Modern Warfare
 Best Voice Over TV Spot (for a Feature Film): Emma
 Most Original TV Spot (for a Feature Film): Jojo Rabbit
 Best Documentary TV Spot (for a Feature Film): The Social Dilemma
 Best Fantasy Adventure TV Spot (for a Feature Film): Star Wars: The Rise of Skywalker
 Best Original Score TV Spot (for a Feature Film):  Downton Abbey
 Best Sound Editing in a TV Spot (for a Feature Film): Greyhound
 Golden Fleece TV Spot (for a Feature Film): Cats
 Best Action TV Spot/Trailer/Teaser for a Series: Narcos
 Best Animation/Family TV Spot/Trailer/Teaser for a Series: Home Before Dark
 Best Comedy TV Spot/Trailer/Teaser for a Series: Motherland
 Best Drama TV Spot/Trailer/Teaser for a Series: The Queen's Gambit
 Best Documentary/Reality TV Spot/Trailer/Teaser for a Series: A Perfect Planet 60′ Trail
 Best Fantasy Adventure TV Spot/Trailer/Teaser for a Series: The Nevers
 Best Foreign TV Spot/Trailer/Teaser for a Series: Our Boys
 Best Graphics in a TV Spot/Trailer/Teaser for a Series: Sky Rojo
 Best Horror/Thriller TV Spot/Trailer/Teaser for a Series: The Purge
 Best Music TV Spot/Trailer/Teaser for a Series: The Crown
 Best Original Score TV Spot/Trailer/Teaser for a Series: The Underground Railroad
 Best Sound Editing TV Spot/Trailer/Teaser for a Series: FX on Hulu, “The Future”, FX Networks.
 Best Voice Over in a TV Spot/Trailer/Teaser for a Series: Dave Chappelle Sticks & Stones “TV Spot”, Netflix, Netflix In-House.
 Most Original TV Spot/Trailer/Teaser for a Series: WandaVision
 Best Promo for a OTO or Special: FX on Hulu, “The Ride”, FX Networks, Buddha Jones. 
 Best Promo for a TV Network: FX on Hulu,  “The Future”, FX Networks, Buddha Jones. 
 Best Title/Credit Sequence for a Feature Length Film (or Video Game): Shazam!
 Best Title/Credit Sequence for a TV/Streaming Series: The Most Dangerous Animal of All
 Best Action Poster: 1917
 Best Animation/Family Movie Poster: Wolfwalkers
 Best Billboard: Blumhouse Glow In The Dark Billboard, Prime Video, LA
 Best Comedy Poster: Jojo Rabbit
 Best Documentary Poster: The Painter and the Thief
 Best Drama Poster: The Little Things
 Best Fantasy Adventure Poster: Star Wars: The Rise of Skywalker
 Best Foreign Poster: The Unlit
 Best Horror Poster: It Chapter Two
 Best Independent Poster: Synchronic 
 Best International Poster: 1917
 Best Motion Poster: Soul 
 Best Summer 2019 Blockbuster Poster: The Lion King
 Best Teaser Poster: John Wick: Chapter 3 – Parabellum
 Best Thriller Poster: Vivarium
 Best Video Game Poster: Mortal Kombat 11
 Best Wildposts: Zack Snyder's Justice League Character Art, HBO Max, Gravillis 
 Most Original Poster: Borat Subsequent Moviefilm
 Best Animation/Family Poster for a TV/Streaming Series: Here We Art Key Art
 Best Comedy Poster for a TV/Streaming Series: Dave
 Best Documentary/Reality Poster for a TV/Streaming Series: Night Stalker: The Hunt For a Serial Killer
 Best Drama/Action Poster for a TV/Streaming Series: Brave New World
 Best Horror/Thriller Poster for a TV/Streaming Series: American Horror Story: 1984
 Best WildPosts for a TV/Streaming Series: Ted Lasso
 Most Innovative Advertising for a Feature Film:  Godzilla: King of the Monsters
 Best Viral Campaign for a Feature Film: Jojo Rabbit
 Best Action/Thriller TrailerByte for a Feature Film: 1917
 Best Animation TrailerByte for a Feature Film: Soul 
 Best Comedy / Drama TrailerByte for a Feature Film: Jojo Rabbit
 Best Horror / Thriller TrailerByte for a Feature Film: Come True
 Most Innovative Advertising for a TV/Streaming Series: For Life
 Best Viral Campaign for a TV / Streaming Series: Narcos
 Best Action / Thriller TrailerByte for a TV / Streaming Series: The Boys
 Best Animation TrailerByte for a TV / Streaming Series: Kipo & The Age Of Wonderbeasts
 Best Comedy / Drama TrailerByte for a TV / Streaming Series: Why Women Kill
 Best Horror / Thriller TrailerByte for a TV / Streaming Series: Chernobyl
 Best BTS/EPK for a Feature Film (Under 2 minutes): Ready or Not
 Best BTS/EPK for a Feature Film (Over 2 minutes): Star Wars: The Rise of Skywalker
 Best BTS/EPK for a TV/Streaming Series (Under 2 minutes): On the Rocks
 Best BTS/EPK for a TV/Streaming Series (Over 2 minutes): See
 Best Radio/Audio Spot (All Genres): Midnight Sky

2022
The 22nd Golden Trailer Awards were presented on October 6, 2022. The nominations were announced on August 2, 2022.

Show

Non-Show (Theatrical)

Streaming

TV Spots (Theatrical)

2023

References

External links
 The Golden Trailer Awards
 "Here & Now" (NPR) discusses "What Makes a Great Trailer" with Golden Trailer Awards Cofounder Monica Brady

American film awards